The Island Yacht Club is a proprietary yacht club in Toronto, Ontario Canada. The club is accessible from April to October using the club's private boat from downtown. The club has its own marina providing docking and marine services to members. Since 2015, it has been owned by Blockhouse Bay Management Company.

Facilities
Facilities provided by the club include a clubhouse, tennis courts, nature trail and pool. Social activities include holiday buffets and barbecues, sailing lessons and camps, family and children's activities. Dockage is available for both power and sailboats. The clubhouse incorporates a dining room, bar, lounge, locker rooms and a children's club annex. The east side of Mugg's Island is a bird sanctuary.

The  clubhouse was designed for "people who would rather be outside" by Montgomery Sisam Architects in 2006. It won the Ontario Association of Architects Design of Excellence. This clubhouse was built to replace the original clubhouse, which burned down in June 2004.

History
The Island Yacht Club was founded in 1951 by a small group of Jewish sailing enthusiasts.

According to an article by Pierre Berton published in Maclean’s Magazine on November 1, 1948: "Segregation by race at which Canadians are apt to look askance when it is practiced in the southern United States, is just as strong in the Canadian social world as it is in the economic world. There are golf clubs which make no bones about the fact that they won’t accept Jewish members, college fraternities and sororities, which exclude Jewish students. Members of these clubs have argued that in private, social organizations they should be allowed to choose the people they associate with."

It was in this social climate that Carl Keyfetz was retained in the spring of 1951 to obtain a Provincial Charter for a Social Club to be located on Mugg’s Island that would be dedicated to the promotion of "yachting, badminton, squash, tennis, bowling, skating, swimming, curling and other games of sport and to arrange matches and competitions of every nature and to offer or grant and contribute towards prizes awards and distinctions". 

On October 16, 1951 an organizing meeting was held at the home of Cecil Yolles with Jack and Estelle Morris, Bill Ackerman, Bob Singer, Dick Lorie, Bert Jacobs, Mel Gould, Eon Gilmore, Norm Kirzner, Leo Perkel, Dr. S. Leibel, Cecil Yolles, Denny Yolles, Dr. Bernard "Bunny" Willinsky, John Bussin, Joe Kitz, Barney Alper, Ben Dunkelman, Irving Gould and Mark Speyer in attendance. The first directors were John Bliss, salesman; Irving and Malville Gould, managers and Carl Keyfetz, solicitor.

Only qualified and proven sailors were to be allowed to fly the IYC burgee. Training was mandatory. A Disciplinary Committee was established under the chairmanship of the Sailing Master with power to penalize, fine or expel members who did not conform with government regulations or any regulations that the club might, from time to time, see fit to pass. With Johnny Bussin responsible for seamanship instruction, Bunny Willinsky sharing his knowledge of boat handling and safety at sea and Irving Gould in charge of navigation and chart work, all members were expected to become qualified skippers so that they would not injure themselves or embarrass the rest of the members or the club. In addition to "fostering sportsmanship and seamanship among Jewish youth and its members", the club was to provide "social facilities to all visiting yachtsmen" and to "foster a better understanding between Jewish and Gentile yachtsmen". The first Commodore of the Island Yacht Club and a major force for the growth of the club was Dr. Bunny Willinsky. Membership peaked at 350 in the 1970s and has steadily dropped since then.

The fundamental issue of whether or not it was to be an exclusively "Jewish yacht club" was addressed and decided quickly. Notwithstanding the way that others had treated them, the answer from the founders was a principled and emphatic "no". At a meeting on February 4, 1952 "upon motion regularly made and seconded, it was unanimously decided that all applications for membership from persons of other than the Jewish faith would be given the same consideration as all other applications." This was a first for private clubs in Toronto and a policy that continues to this day.

The clubhouse was built in 2006 to replace the original clubhouse, which burned down in June 2004. The original clubhouse housed the formal dining room, bar, cafeteria style snack bar, where Friday nights were movie night; men's and ladies' locker rooms with saunas and lounges, the Junior Club where young sailors and children of members could relax with their peers and the Sailor's Lounge where you could often find members playing cards or relaxing, either inside the lounge, or outside on the deck.  Although some of these activities have been discontinued (e.g., movie night) there is an active youth program that helps cement the club as a family-oriented facility. Other adult activities include Weekday Mah Jong, tennis tournaments, adult sail, canoeing and kayaking.

By 2014, the club was experiencing a decline in membership numbers and severe financial challenges.   In 2015 it re-emerged as Spoke on the Water, a division of the proprietary Spoke Club. Several years later, the Spoke Club itself closed.

Club features
 Social and boating memberships
 Docks for both power and sailboats
 Marine services including secure winter storage
 Sailboats and kayaks for member use
 Four tennis courts
 Heated outdoor swimming pool- with supervised hours
 Men's and women's locker rooms
 Family and children's programs & activities
 Supervised children's playground, arts & crafts house and playhouse
 Casual and gourmet dining and social areas
 Meeting and catering facilities
Private tender to the club from 539 Queen's Quay W. Toronto

References

Yacht clubs in Canada
1951 establishments in Ontario
Sport in Toronto
Toronto Islands